The Flammenwerfer 35, or FmW 35  (flame thrower) was a one-man German flamethrower used during World War II to clear out trenches and buildings. It could project fuel up to 25 meters from the user.

Description
The firing device is activated at the same time with the Selbstschlussventil and is inside the protective pipe. The Flammenwerfer 35 was produced until 1941, when the lighter, slightly redesigned Flammenwerfer 41 began replacing it.

Use 
This flamethrower, like all flamethrowers employed by the Wehrmacht, was exclusively used by sturmpionieres (assault pioneers); specialist pioneers who were to assist the infantry in an assault, by overcoming natural and man-made obstacles for the infantry, clearing enemy fortifications with flamethrowers and then destroying them with demolition charges. The sturmpionieres that exclusively used these flamethrowers played an important part in overcoming French fortifications blocking the German advance during the Battle of France. More specifically the Battle of Sedan (1940).

See also 
List of flamethrowers

References

External links 

World War II infantry weapons of Germany
Flamethrowers
Military equipment introduced in the 1930s